Jiangning was an old name of Nanjing, China.

Jiangning may also refer to:

Jiangning District, a district in Nanjing
Jiangning Subdistrict, a subdistrict in Jiangning District
Jiangning Prefecture, a historical prefecture centered in Nanjing
Jiangning Town, a town in Bobai County, Guangxi, China

See also
Jiang Ning (born 1986), Chinese footballer
Jiangning Road Subdistrict, a subdistrict in Shanghai, China